The Seduction may refer to:
 The Seduction (film), a 1982 thriller film written and directed by David Schmoeller
 The Seduction (album), the first full-length LP by Manchester post-punk group Ludus
 The Visit/The Seduction, a 2002 CD reissue of two records by Ludus

See also

 A Seduction
 Seduction (disambiguation)